Painted pebbles are a class of Early Medieval artifact found in northern Scotland dating from the first millennium CE.

Appearance 
They are small rounded beach pebbles made of quartzite, which have been painted with simple designs in a dye which is now dark brown in colour. It has not proven possible to analyse the dye itself from the stains that remain.

The motifs are carefully executed and the most common are dots and wavy lines. Other motifs are small circles, pentacles, crescents and triangles, showing strong relationships with the Pictish symbol stone motifs.

Experimental archaeology suggests that the designs were likely to have been painted with peat tar.

Distribution 

To date, 55 painted pebbles have been found. 11 of these were found in Caithness, 5 in Orkney and 27 in Shetland. Most have come from broch sites which have been shown to have had an extensive post-broch occupation. An ogham-inscribed spindle-whorl was associated with one find at Buckquoy in Orkney (see Buckquoy spindle whorl). Several have been associated with wheelhouses or their outbuildings. An example was found at a Pictish site at Buckquoy in Orkney as reported in 1976. It had the "small ring" type decoration.

Cultural significance 
Scottish painted pebbles have been dated to the period 200 AD to the eighth century AD, the Pictish period. They may have been sling-stones that were thought to be of magical nature by the Picts; however, local traditions suggest that they were "charm-stones", often known as "cold-stones". Such stones were used within living memory to cure sickness in animals and humans.

In the Life of St. Columba it is recorded that he visited King Bridei in Pictland in around the year 565 AD and, taking a white stone pebble from the River Ness, he blessed it and any water it came into contact with would cure sick people. It floated in water and cured the king from a terminal illness. It remained as one of the great treasures of the king and cured many others.

See also 
Amulets
Apotrope
Azilian pebbles
Touch pieces

References

Bibliography

External links 
The Museum of Scottish Country Life
St Columba's charm stone

8th century in Scotland
1st-millennium works
Amulets
Archaeological artefact types
Archaeological discoveries in the United Kingdom
Magic items
Pictish culture
Rock art in Europe
Scottish art
Scottish folklore
Superstitions of Great Britain